Divalan (also Romanized as Dīvālān) is a village in Melkari Rural District, Vazineh District, Sardasht County, West Azerbaijan Province, Iran. At the 2021 census, its population was 460, in 72 families.

References 

Populated places in Sardasht County